Khairo is a town in the Punjab province of Pakistan. It is located at 30°18'35N 70°14'15E with an altitude of 667 metres (2191 feet).

References

Villages in Punjab, Pakistan